

The Frank O'Connor International Short Story Award—named in honour of Frank O'Connor, who devoted much of his work to the form—was an international literary award presented for the best short story collection. It was presented between 2005 and 2015. The prize amount, is one of the richest short-story collection prizes in the world (see also Premio de Narrativa Breve Ribera del Duero). Each year, roughly sixty books were longlisted, with either four or six books shortlisted, the ultimate decision made by three judges.

History
In 2000, the Cork, Ireland Munster Literature Centre organised the first Frank O'Connor International Short Story Festival, an event dedicated to the celebration of the short story and named for Cork writer Frank O'Connor. The festival showcases readings, literary forums and workshops. Following continued growth and additional funding, the Cork City – Frank O'Connor International Short Story Award was introduced in 2005, coinciding with Cork's designation as that year's European Capital of Culture.

In 2008 there was no shortlist, as the judges considered the winning book, Unaccustomed Earth by Jhumpa Lahiri, as being superior to other books on the longlist.

The award was discontinued in 2016.

Recipients

See also
 Irish short story, detailing the importance of the short story form in Irish culture

References

External links
 The Cork City – Frank O'Connor Short Story Award , city website
 Munster Literature Centre

2005 establishments in Ireland
Awards established in 2005
Culture in Cork (city)
Irish literary awards
Short story awards
International literary awards